In the dystopian novel Nineteen Eighty-Four (1949), by George Orwell, the Two Minutes Hate is the daily, public period during which members of the Outer Party of Oceania must watch a film depicting Emmanuel Goldstein, the principal enemy of the state, and his followers, The Brotherhood, and loudly voice their hatred for the enemy and then their love of Big Brother. 

The political purpose of the Two Minutes Hate is to allow the citizens of Oceania to vent their existential anguish and personal hatreds towards politically expedient enemies: Goldstein and the enemy super-state of the moment. In re-directing the members' subconscious feelings away from the Party's government of Oceania, and towards non-existent external enemies, the Party minimises thoughtcrime and the consequent, subversive behaviours of thoughtcriminals.

Purpose
In the novel Nineteen Eighty-Four, the first session of Two Minutes Hate shows the introduction of O'Brien, a member of the Inner Party, to the story of Winston Smith, the protagonist whose feelings communicate the effectiveness of the Party's psychological manipulation and control of Oceanian society:

Brainwashing of the participants in the Two Minutes Hate includes auditory and visual cues, such as "a hideous, grinding speech, as of some monstrous machine running without oil" that burst from the telescreen, meant to psychologically excite the crowd into an emotional frenzy of hatred, fear, and loathing for Emmanuel Goldstein, and for Oceania's enemy of the moment, either Eastasia or Eurasia. The hate session includes the participants throwing things at the telescreen showing the film, as does the Julia character. In the course of the Two Minutes Hate, the film image of Goldstein metamorphoses into the face of a bleating sheep, as enemy soldiers advance towards the viewers of the film, before one enemy soldier charges towards the viewers, whilst firing his sub-machinegun; the face of that soldier then becomes the face of Big Brother. At the end of the two-minute session of hatred, the members of the Party ritualistically chant "B-B . . . B-B . . . B-B . . . B-B." To maintain the extreme emotions provoked in the Two Minutes Hate sessions, the Party created Hate Week, a week-long festival of hatreds.

Instances and parallels

The attacks on the liberal opposition by state-owned Russian television channels such as Russia-1 and RT have been characterised as reminiscent of the "two minutes hate". Russian television portrayed Ukrainian troops as monsters during the War in Donbas. One of the most notorious examples was a 2014 hoax report on Channel One Russia that Ukrainian soldiers had crucified a three-year-old child.
Conversely, social media network Facebook allowing hate speech and even calls for violence against Russian soldiers during their government's invasion of Ukraine have been characterised as reminiscent of the "two minutes hate".

American propaganda by the Committee on Public Information during World War I has also been compared to the propaganda in the "two minutes hate" program.

See also

 Classical conditioning
 Enemy of the people
 Propaganda
 Struggle session

References

Fictional elements introduced in 1949
Nineteen Eighty-Four
Propaganda in fiction
Fictional events